Tansèga may refer to:

Tansèga, Boudry, Burkina Faso
Tansèga, Zoungou, Burkina Faso